Parkes College is a college of the Waurn Ponds campus of Deakin University. It was developed from 2011 and opened in 2014 as part of the National Rental Affordability Scheme (NRAS).

Parkes College offers students studio apartments to rent, featuring private bedrooms, kitchenettes, and bathrooms, as well as shared study rooms.

See also
Alfred Deakin College (Deakin University)
Barton College (Deakin University)

References

Colleges of Deakin University